Mr. Right (Chinese: 恋爱先生) is a 2018 Chinese television series starring Jin Dong and Jiang Shuying. It is the second installment of the 'Gentleman' series following To Be a Better Man (2016). The series is airing on Jiangsu TV and Dragon TV starting January 12, 2018.

Despite its high ratings, the series has received mixed critical reviews and audience response.

Synopsis
The story follows three men as they find their significant other. Cheng Hao is a successful Beijing dentist, who on his free time likes to give advice on how to pursue women. He hasn’t been in love before. During a business trip in Antwerp, he clashes with Luo Yue, who is wary of men and relationships. Back in Beijing, the two individuals continue to war — and gradually becomes close. Meanwhile, Cheng Hao's business partner Zhang Mingyang seeks his advice on how to pursue a girl, and she turns out to be none other than Gu Yao, Cheng Hao's university crush. His friend, Zou Beiye also seeks Cheng Hao's advice on how to pursue Qiao Yilin, a supermodel.

Cast

Main

 Jin Dong as Cheng Hao
 A dentist of a high-end clinic, and also an online love expert who gives out relationship advice.
 Jiang Shuying as Luo Yue
 A hotel manager. She has been hurt by numerous men and becomes wary of relationships.
 Li Naiwen as Zhang Mingyang
 Cheng Hao's business partner. He is a flirtatious man with numerous relationships but changes into a loyal man after he falls in love with Gu Yao.
 Xin Zhilei as Gu Yao
 Cheng Hao's former classmate and ideal lover. A beautiful and talented girl admired by many.
 Calvin Li as Song Ningyu
 Luo Yue's pursuer, Gu Yao's former husband.
 Tian Yu as Zou Beiye
 Cheng Hao's business partner.
 Song Yanfei as Qiao Yilin
 A model with a straightforward and adorable personality. She has a love-hate relationship with Zou Beiye.

Supporting

 Ni Dahong as Cheng Hongdou, Cheng Hao's father.
 Cui Yi as Liu Zhenzhen, Luo Yue's mother.
 Zhugang Reyao as Wang Yan
 Kang Ning as Xu Le
 Wang Sen as Du Kai
 Yin Xu as Chen Jing
 Cheng Haofeng as Wang Ning
 Luo Yukun as Shan Shan
 Chu Shuanzhong as Wu Fei
 Wang Qing as Guo Min
 Chen Xinxuan as Xiao Mei, Head nurse at Cheng Hao's clinic.
 Xia Nan as Yoyo

Production 
The series is produced and written by the team behind To Be a Better Man. William Chang acts as the style director.  It was filmed in Beijing (China), Las Vegas (United States of America) and Antwerp (Belgium) between April to August 2017.

Soundtrack

Reception

Ratings 

 Highest ratings are marked in red, lowest ratings are marked in blue

Awards and nominations

References

External links

 

Dragon Television original programming
Jiangsu Television original programming
Chinese romantic comedy television series
2018 Chinese television series debuts
2018 Chinese television series endings